In Belgium, fire departments are still mainly funded by the community or local government. However, starting January 1, 2015, the Reformation of Fire Departments and Civil Protection was complete. From then on, the fire departments will be grouped into 32 'Rescue Zones'. These can be looked at as a corporation that is partly self-reliant, but with funding by the federal government. This reformation was issued after the gas explosion of Ghislenghien in 2004, where it became apparent that equipment and procedures were outdated. Belgian fire fighter academies have begun adapting newer techniques, such as the Swedish techniques for structural firefighting or USA's RIT-procedure (Rapid Intervention Team). One of the first measures of the reformation put into action was the SAH, meaning that, regardless of territorial boundaries, the fire department who can arrive at the scene the fastest with the most adequate equipment (one driver, one petty officer and four fire fighters) will be the first one to turn out and handle the call until the department who has jurisdiction arrives.

Belgium relies on about 17,000 fire fighters in total, consisting of around 5,000 professional fire fighters (mainly in larger cities) and 12,000 volunteers. Also, almost all EMS interventions in Belgium are carried out by fire departments, more specifically fire fighters who have successfully completed their EMS formation. In some departments fire fighters are obligated to take the EMS formation or even get a permit to drive a truck. Belgium uses a military ranking system, going from fire fighter all the way to colonel - mirroring the French system.

One exception to the Belgian fire departments is Brussels Capital Region. Since the Brussels Regional Government has its own service directing and managing both EMS and fire services, they frequently tend to have other procedures and regulations. For example: in Brussels fire fighters are equipped with orange turn-out gear and officers wear black gear, whereas the rest of Belgium uses this the other way around. The governmental organ responsible for this organisation is called the Fire and Urgent Medical Aid Service

Ranks

Rank structure as of 2015

Obsolete ranks

Officer promotion controversy 
When the Belgian civil security reform came into force in 2014, all firefighter officers were automatically promoted to a higher rank, whether they held the appropriate certificate or not. This led to numerous disputes and was the subject of one of the demands announced during the demonstrations by Belgian firefighters before and after the reform, non-commissioned officers and men in the ranks feeling aggrieved, because no similar measure was planned for them.

References 

Belgium
Emergency services in Belgium